Abdullah Sahib was the Governor of Gilgit Agency during Dogra rule and was one of the earliest graduates of Muhammadan Anglo-Oriental College. He was the father of Pakistani writer Qudrat Ullah Shahab.

Early life
He was born in an Arain family of Chimkor Sahib village, in Ambala district Punjab, British India. At age six he was orphaned. After losing his father's property in loan servicing he dedicated his life to education—something that could not be taken away from him—and became the first Muslim student to top the matriculation examination in Ambala District, Punjab province during the early period of the Aligarh Movement led by Sir Syed Ahmed Khan. Abdullah Sahib soon joined Muhammadan Anglo-Oriental College where he excelled in English, Arabic, Persian, Philosophy and Mathematics. When he finished his BA he was one of the earliest graduates of Muhammadan Anglo-Oriental College.

Career 
Syed arranged a scholarship for Sahib to take the Indian Civil Service exam in England, which he refused following his mother's request. He became upset and expelled him from Aligarh and asked him not to show his face again. Abdullah Sahib honoured his words and became a clerk in remote Gilgit. He was soon made governor of the province. He spent eighteen to twenty years there and his three sons and three daughters were born there. He was a close associate of Maharaja Pratap Singh, and was an expert on international relations, especially with Russia and China.

See also
Qudrat Ullah Shahab, his son
Aligarh Muslim University

References

 Shahab Nama, by Qudrat Ullah Shahab

Aligarh Muslim University alumni
People from Gilgit
Punjabi people
People from Gilgit-Baltistan
People from Ambala district
Year of birth missing
Year of death missing